Kevin Page, also credited as Ken Page, (born June 20, 1958), is an actor. He is perhaps best known for his recurring roles on Dallas as Steven Bum Jones, right-hand man of J.R. Ewing and on Seinfeld as Stu Chermack. He also appears in the 1987 film RoboCop as Mr. Kinney, a young executive who is violently killed by an ED-209 police robot during a boardroom demonstration gone wrong.

Career
Kevin Page played Bum, a henchman of J.R. Ewing who was eventually revealed to be his killer in the rebooted series second-season finale Legacies.

Personal life
Kevin Page opened an art gallery in Dallas, Texas.

Page worked as a stockbroker for Smith Barney from 1997 to 1998.

Page lives with his wife, Linda. They have a daughter named Isabella.

Filmography

References

External links
 
 

Living people
1959 births
American male film actors
American male video game actors
American male television actors
20th-century American male actors
21st-century American male actors